Cheilotrichia is a genus of crane flies in the family Limoniidae.

Species
Subgenus Cheilotrichia Rossi, 1848
C. aemula Savchenko, 1974
C. alicia (Alexander, 1914)
C. aroo Theischinger, 1994
C. brincki Alexander, 1964
C. cinerea (Strobl, 1898)
C. clausa (Alexander, 1921)
C. fully Podenas & Geiger, 2001
C. gloriola Alexander, 1962
C. guttipennis Alexander, 1961
C. imbuta (Meigen, 1818)
C. laetipennis (Alexander, 1936)
C. meridiana Mendl, 1974
C. monosticta (Alexander, 1927)
C. monstrosa Bangerter, 1947
C. palauensis Alexander, 1972
C. schmidiana Alexander, 1964
C. vagans Savchenko, 1972
C. valai Stary, 1992
Subgenus Empeda Osten Sacken, 1869

C. abitaguai (Alexander, 1941)
C. accomoda (Alexander, 1951)
C. affinis (Lackschewitz, 1927)
C. aklavikensis Alexander, 1966
C. albidibasis (Alexander, 1936)
C. alpina (Strobl, 1895)
C. alticola (Alexander, 1925)
C. angustistigma (Alexander, 1930)
C. apemon Alexander, 1970
C. appressa Alexander, 1970
C. areolata (Lundstrom, 1912)
C. austronymphica (Alexander, 1943)
C. baluchistanica (Alexander, 1944)
C. basalis (Alexander, 1921)
C. boliviana (Alexander, 1930)
C. bonaespei (Alexander, 1917)
C. brachyclada (Alexander, 1940)
C. brevifida Alexander, 1970
C. brevior (Brunetti, 1912)
C. brumalis (Alexander, 1947)
C. caledonica Hynes, 1993
C. cheloma Alexander, 1970
C. cinerascens (Meigen, 1804)
C. cinereipleura (Alexander, 1917)
C. clarkeana Alexander, 1972
C. coangustata (Alexander, 1944)
C. complicata (Alexander, 1922)
C. crassicrus (Edwards, 1928)
C. crassistyla Alexander, 1973
C. curta (Alexander, 1925)
C. deludens (Alexander, 1939)
C. destituta (Alexander, 1942)
C. dimelania Alexander, 1964
C. divaricata (Alexander, 1939)
C. exilistyla (Alexander, 1949)
C. femoralis (Edwards, 1919)
C. fuscoapicalis Alexander, 1970
C. fuscocincta (Alexander, 1940)
C. fuscohalterata (Strobl, 1906)
C. fuscostigmata Alexander, 1970
C. gloydae (Alexander, 1950)
C. gracilis (de Meijere, 1911)
C. hamiltoni (Alexander, 1939)
C. instrenua (Alexander, 1942)
C. japonica (Alexander, 1920)
C. kuranda Theischinger, 1994
C. liliputina (Alexander, 1930)
C. longifurcata (Alexander, 1940)
C. longisquama (Alexander, 1938)
C. lunensis (Alexander, 1931)
C. luteivena Alexander, 1970
C. maneauensis Alexander, 1960
C. mayanymphica (Alexander, 1946)
C. melanostyla Alexander, 1970
C. microdonta Alexander, 1957
C. microtrichiata (Alexander, 1930)
C. minima (Strobl, 1898)
C. minuscula (Alexander, 1920)
C. neglecta (Lackschewitz, 1927)
C. nemorensis (Santos Abreu, 1923)
C. nigristyla Alexander, 1970
C. nigroapicalis (Alexander, 1920)
C. nigrolineata (Enderlein, 1912)
C. nigrostylata (Alexander, 1936)
C. noctivagans (Alexander, 1917)
C. nymphica (Alexander, 1928)
C. ochricauda (Alexander, 1925)
C. oresitropha (Alexander, 1927)
C. paratytthos Alexander, 1957
C. percupida (Alexander, 1941)
C. perflavens (Alexander, 1948)
C. perrata (Alexander, 1932)
C. perscitula Alexander, 1973
C. platymeson Alexander, 1968
C. poiensis (Edwards, 1926)
C. praelata (Alexander, 1936)
C. pubescens (Alexander, 1913)
C. rata (Alexander, 1932)
C. scitula (Alexander, 1927)
C. simplicior (Alexander, 1951)
C. staryi Mendl, 1973
C. stigmatica (Osten Sacken, 1869)
C. stygia (Alexander, 1927)
C. subborealis (Alexander, 1955)
C. subnubila (Alexander, 1940)
C. suffumata (Edwards, 1933)
C. sulfureoclavata (Alexander, 1930)
C. sutrina (Alexander, 1941)
C. tanneri Alexander, 1970
C. tarsalis (Edwards, 1928)
C. telacantha Alexander, 1960
C. tenuifurca Podenas & Gelhaus, 2001
C. toklat (Alexander, 1955)
C. tridentata (Alexander, 1925)
C. tristimonia (Alexander, 1943)
C. tumidistyla Alexander, 1970
C. tytthos Alexander, 1957
C. umiat (Alexander, 1955)
C. unidentata (Alexander, 1925)
C. vaillanti (Alexander, 1922)
C. vasanta Alexander, 1964
C. zimmermani Alexander,  197

References

Limoniidae
Tipulomorpha genera